Richard Stanford (born 25 April 1986 in Wellington, Australia) is a rugby union footballer. He plays for the Waratahs in Super Rugby having previously represented the Brumbies and Western Force . His regular playing position is lock.

He made his senior debut for the Brumbies during the 2006 Super 14 season against the Chiefs.

External links 
 Waratahs player profile
 itsrugby.co.uk profile

Rugby union locks
Living people
Australian rugby union players
1986 births
New South Wales Waratahs players
ACT Brumbies players
Western Force players
Rugby union players from New South Wales
New South Wales Country Eagles players